Amina Sewali (born 23 June 1989) is a Norwegian singer, songwriter, and actress. She is best known for performing as Solveig in a 2014 production of Peer Gynt at the National Theatre in Oslo, and took part in Melodi Grand Prix 2017 with the song "Mesterverk".

Life and career
In 2006, Sewali performed as a singer and dancer in a production of Izzat – en kjærlighetsopera at the Norwegian National Opera and Ballet. The following year, she joined the show Glatte gater, broadcast on NRK. The show was turned into a film, 99% Ærlig, the following year. The film went on to be nominated for "Best Music" and "Best Documentary" at the 2009 Amanda Awards. In 2010, she was a lyricist, composer, and actress in Tæsjern på Grønland, a modern-day adaptation of the play The Merchant of Venice by William Shakespeare. In 2012, she performed at the Oslo Philharmonic.

In 2010, she released her debut single, "One More Digit", after being signed by Warner Music Norway. Her debut self-titled studio album was released in 2011, and was produced by Even Johansen. She was released from her label in 2011. In 2013, she went on a tour with Concerts Norway, called Amina Sewali – Gjør det selv!. In 2014, Sewali performed as Solveig in a 2014 production of Peer Gynt at the National Theatre in Oslo. In 2017, she was announced as a participant in Melodi Grand Prix 2017 with the song "Mesterverk". She competed in the final on 11 March 2017.

Personal life
Sewali was born in Uganda, but emigrated to Norway at age four, where she settled in Oslo.

Discography

Albums

Singles

References

1989 births
21st-century Norwegian actresses
Living people
Melodi Grand Prix contestants
Musicians from Oslo
Norwegian pop singers
Norwegian songwriters
Norwegian stage actresses
Norwegian-language singers
Ugandan emigrants to Norway
Warner Music Group artists
21st-century Norwegian singers
21st-century Norwegian women singers